In Andorra, the standard time is Central European Time (CET; UTC+01:00). Daylight saving time is observed from the last Sunday in March (02:00 CET) to the last Sunday in October (03:00 CEST). Andorra adopted CET after WWII.

Time notation 
Andorra uses the 24-hour clock.

IANA time zone database 
In the IANA time zone database, Andorra is given the zone Europe/Andorra.

See also 
Time in Europe
List of time zones by country
List of time zones by UTC offset

References

External links 
Current time in Andorra at Time.is